The Henderson County Courthouse, also known as the Historic Henderson County Courthouse and the Old Henderson County Courthouse, is a historic 3-story brick gold-domed Classical Revival style courthouse building located  at One Historic Courthouse Square, corner of  1st and Main streets in Hendersonville, North Carolina.

It is Henderson County's second courthouse and is adjacent to site of the 1840s courthouse which was razed upon its completion. Famed architect Frank Pierce Milburn was asked in 1903 to design the new courthouse, but the county commissioners rejected his design and instead hired Englishman Richard Sharp Smith, who was the resident architect of the Biltmore Estate after the death of Richard Morris Hunt in 1895. Construction by local builder W. F. Edwards began in 1904 and was completed in July, 1905.

The old courthouse was closed for renovations after the completion of a new courthouse at 200 North Grove Street in 1995. The restored 1905 courthouse currently houses the Henderson County Heritage Museum and some government offices.

On May 10, 1979, the Historic Henderson County Courthouse was added to the National Register of Historic Places. It is located in the Main Street Historic District.

External links
 Henderson County Heritage Museum Website

References

Courthouses on the National Register of Historic Places in North Carolina
Neoclassical architecture in North Carolina
Government buildings completed in 1905
Museums in Henderson County, North Carolina
County courthouses in North Carolina
Clock towers in North Carolina
Buildings and structures in Henderson County, North Carolina
National Register of Historic Places in Henderson County, North Carolina
Historic district contributing properties in North Carolina
1905 establishments in North Carolina
Hendersonville, North Carolina